Ectoedemia obtusa is a moth of the family Nepticulidae. It is found in Spain, France, Italy, Croatia and in Turkmenistan. It is probably also present elsewhere on the Balkan Peninsula and in Turkey and Iran.

Adults are on wing in May and June.

The larvae are thought to feed on Fraxinus species.

External links
Fauna Europaea
Ectoedemia (Etainia) obtusa (Puplesis & Diškus, 1996) new for Europe: taxonomy, distribution and biology (Nepticulidae)

Nepticulidae
Moths of Europe
Moths of Asia
Moths described in 1996